The World Creole Music Festival (WCMF) is an annual three-day music festival hosted on the island of Dominica during the final weekend in October, as a conclusion to Creole heritage month. 

WCMF is a noted festival of Dominica, and it provides entertainment dedicated to the advancement of global Creole culture and music.

History

The World Creole Music Festival was launched to promote Dominican tourism and create a platform for indigenous Dominican music.

The festival begins on the last Friday in October each year.  Entertainers from the Caribbean, French Antilles, Africa and North America attend.

The festival began in 1997 during International Creole Month October to bolster lagging tourist arrivals during the island's Independence celebrations which culminate on November 3rd. Dubbed "The Festival That Never Sleeps" because of its evening kickoffs which last into the morning, The World Creole Musical Festival is part of a three-week festival that also features the Cadence-Lypso Competition and Creole In The Park.

The festival has focused on musical genres with roots in various forms of musical fusion from various countries of the Creole-speaking world.

Musical forms played at the festival include Cadence-lypso, Kompa, Zouk, Soukous, Bouyon, Zydeco (from the US state of Louisiana).

The festival is managed by the Dominica Festivals Committee (DFC), formerly headed by Executive Directors Claudine Springer (2016), Natalie Clarke (2012-2014) and Val "Young Bull" Cuffy, who had a decade-long tenure and currently serves as a consultant to the DFC.

Popularity
Dominica's World Creole Music Festival attracts regional and international media coverage.

The festival is noted for building regional cooperation and network capabilities in tourism, culture, and entertainment while catering to over 10,000 patrons, 100 international and regional media partners and upwards of 20 cultural and musical acts each year.

2016 World Creole Music Festival

The World Creole Music Festival returned in 2016 following a one year hiatus in the wake of devastation levied by Tropical Storm Erika.

Under the guidance of then Executive Director Claudine Springer, for the first time in its history, the festival launched live on television across the Caribbean, in the US and via the web portals of the Discover Dominica Authority. The festival blended Caribbean culture with diverse musical styles.

The festival featured a modern aesthetic and a smaller and refocused campaign, designed to attract a broader cross section of the Caribbean market.

Conducted without an Executive Director following the resignation of Springer, the festival returned with a fresh perspective, and an overhaul to the venue, The former ED's distinctive style easily recognizable in the shows.

Timaya,
Midnite Groovers,
Kreyol La,
Original Bouyon Pioneers,
La Grand Mechant Zouk,
Popcaan,
Triple Kay International,
Ophelia,
Extasy,
Dédé St. Prix,
Morgan Heritage,
Kes The Band & Mr. Killa,
Wyclef Jean,
WCK,
Breve,
T-Micky,
Gentleman,
Michele Henderson,
Asa Bantan and 
Akon comprised the official lineup of the 19th edition of the World Creole Music Festival, widely lauded as the best hosted to date in Dominica.

Past Performers
The World Creole Music Festival has played host to Creole entertainers including Kassav', Tabou Combo, Exile One, Gramacks/New Generation, WCK, Triple Kay Global, T-Vice, First Serenade, Zouk Machine, Magnum Band, Zin, Taxi Creole, Carimi, Ophelia Marie, Michele Henderson, Tanya St. Val, Sakis, and Francky Vincent.

References 

Music festivals in the Caribbean
Dominica music